Thalassomonas viridans  is a Gram-negative, aerobic and motile bacterium from the genus of Thalassomonas which has been isolated from an oyster from the Mediterranean coast from Spain.

References

 

Alteromonadales
Bacteria described in 2001